Lysathia is a genus of flea beetles in the family Chrysomelidae. There are 10 described species, found in North America and the Neotropics.

Selected species
 Lysathia aenea Bechyné, 1959
 Lysathia comasagua
 Lysathia ludoviciana (Fall, 1910) (water-primrose flea beetle)
 Lysathia occidentalis (Suffrian, 1868)
 Lysathia vulcanica

References

Further reading

 

Alticini
Chrysomelidae genera
Articles created by Qbugbot